Uruguay's calling code is +598. Since 2010, national long distance calling was eliminated, thus there are no area codes in each city.

Landline telephony 

ANTEL (Spanish abbreviation for National Administration of Telecommunications) is Uruguay's state-owned company for telecommunications.

Previously in Uruguay, phone numbers used to have between 4 and 7 digits. To make a local phone call, you only had to dial those digits. To make a call between two cities from different departments, you had to dial zero, plus area code, plus phone number.

As from August 29, 2010, all phone numbers have 8 digits, according to the new National Numbering Plan. Zero prior to area code was eliminated. Therefore, to make a call to any city in the country you have to dial 8 digits. This plan was implemented by URSEC (Spanish abbreviation for Regulator Unit of Services of Communications).

National Numbering Plan

Montevideo and metropolitan area 
In the Metropolitan area of Montevideo, all national numbers begin with 2. This 8-digit number consists of the former area code (2), followed by the old 7-digit number.

Examples

Outside Montevideo 
In the rest of the country, all national numbers begin with 4. This 8-digit number consists of the number 4, followed by the former area code, followed by the old phone number. For example:

Colonia

There is an exception: in the department of Maldonado, the new 8-digit number consists of the former area code 42, followed by the old phone number, with no additional digit 4 set before:

San Carlos (Maldonado Department)

Calling from other countries 
For calls from outside the country to any city in Uruguay, you only have to add the country code (+598) to the 8-digit national number, replacing the "+" with the international calling prefix used in the originating country (011 from North America, 00 from most other countries, the actual "+" sign from some mobile networks, etc.).

Examples 

Call to Montevideo

Call to Colonia

Former area codes and corresponding new telephone numbers

Mobile telephony 
When mobile telephony arrived in Uruguay, the only company set up the country was Movicom BellSouth. Mobile phone numbers would begin with digits 09, followed by a unique number of 6 digits: 09xxxxxx.

In 1994, ANTEL decided to start its own mobile phone service, creating Ancel, which today is unified to Antel, using this brand to both services. This meant a numbering change for mobile telephony. One number was assigned to each company to identify numbers of each one. This digit would go between 09 and the number. Movicom was assigned number 4, and Ancel number 9. Mobile phones until then (which were Movicom) went to 094xxxxxx, and new Ancel numbers began to be 099xxxxxx.

In 2003, Claro came to Uruguay (formerly as CTI Móvil). Numbers of this company were preceded by 096, like this: 096xxxxxx.

In 2004, Telefónica bought Movicom Bellsouth and changed its name to Movistar.

Since nowadays the numbers of units sold has grown so much, when the companies reached one million users, they had to be assigned with other digits.
 Antel (ADMINISTRACIÓN NACIONAL DE TELECOMUNICACIONES): 099, 098, 092 and 091.
 Movistar (TELEFONICA MOVILES DE URUGUAY S.A.): 094, 095 and 093.
 Claro (AM WIRELESS URUGUAY S.A.): 096 and 097.

URSEC has reserved 084, 089 and 086 for a possible future use.

External links 
 URSEC
 ANTEL
 Full list of area codes

Uruguay
Telecommunications in Uruguay
Telephone numbers